Domestic Life is an American sitcom that aired on CBS from January 4 to April 15, 1984. Steve Martin served as executive producer.

Premise
Martin Crane moved to Seattle to take a commentator job at KMRT-TV. His spot on the station's evening news was called "Domestic Life". Others in the cast were Martin's wife Candy, his 15-year-old daughter Didi, and 10-year-old son Harold.

Production notes
Steve Martin and Martin Mull were friends who met doing stand up. Martin suggested they try to pitch a sitcom starring Mull. The first idea was to do a show about a politician who gets elected to Washington, but NBC passed. They then came up with a Father Knows Best style show. Mull called the show "a gentle spoof of family sitcom cliches." NBC did not want to make it but CBS agreed to make six episodes.

Mull said he wanted his character to talk to camera like George Burns. "We (he and Martin) thought one of my strengths might be as a monloguist, talking right to the camera. So we tried to figure out what kind of occupation a character could have where he could talk right down the barrel. That's why we chose a television commentator."

There were many unintentional similarities between Domestic Life and Frasier which premiered nine years later. Both series were set in Seattle with a character named Martin Crane broadcasting an advice show. Martin Mull's character, Martin Crane, hosts a segment on a local news television show offering his wisdom on the problems of "domestic life", while offering little practical help to his own family.

The show began in January as a mid season replacement.

Reviewing the opening episode the New York Times said "The tone is right, the cast is about perfect and the result is often quite funny".

Ratings were not strong and the show was cancelled. Mull said "I think the only reason they canceled us, since television is a business, was because we weren't getting the numbers. Some perfectly dreadful things get big ratings, so go figure. CBS kept moving us around and people couldn't find us. I think people tend to plan their viewing."

Martin Mull later recalled:
I believe we were voted by Time as one of the top 10 shows of the year on the same day CBS canceled us. And the other thing that sticks in my mind, other than just having a ball doing it, because it was my first starring role, was that Tom Hanks was our warm-up man. He would warm up the audience for us. I don’t know whatever happened to that kid, but he was very good at that.

Cast
Martin Mull as Martin Crane
Judith-Marie Bergan as Candy Crane
Christian Brackett-Zika as Harold Crane
Megan Follows as Didi Crane
Robert Ridgely as Cliff Hamilton
Mie Hunt as Jane Funakubo

US television ratings

Episodes

References

External links

1980s American sitcoms
1984 American television series debuts
1984 American television series endings
CBS original programming
Television shows set in Seattle
Television series about television
English-language television shows
Television series by Universal Television